Rebuff Glacier is a tributary glacier descending from the Deep Freeze Range and entering Campbell Glacier 4 nautical miles (7 km) southeast of the summit of Mount Mankinen, in Victoria Land. Named by the northern party of New Zealand Geological Survey Antarctic Expedition (NZGSAE), 1962–63, because the party was prevented from getting access to it.
 

Glaciers of Victoria Land
Scott Coast